is a Japanese video game hardware and software company. It is the successor to the company Shin Nihon Kikaku and presently owns the SNK video game brand and the Neo Geo video game platform. SNK's predecessor Shin Nihon Kikaku was founded in 1978 by Eikichi Kawasaki. The corporation was initially named . In 1981, the name was informally shortened to SNK Corporation, which became the company's official name in 1986.

SNK is known for its creation of the Neo Geo family of arcade, home, and handheld game consoles in 1990. The Neo Geo line was halted in 2001 because financial troubles forced SNK Corporation to close in the same year. Anticipating the end of the company, Kawasaki founded Playmore Corporation in 2001, which acquired all of the intellectual property of the first iteration of SNK Corporation. In 2003, Playmore Corporation was renamed to SNK Playmore Corporation. In 2016, SNK dropped the name Playmore from its logo and reintroduced its old slogan, "The Future Is Now", officially changing its corporate name back to SNK.

Traditionally, SNK operated primarily as a video game developer, publisher, and hardware manufacturer with a focus on arcade games; however, it has ventured into developing console and PC games. In 2004, SNK started manufacturing pachislot machines, but the company withdrew from the market in 2015. In 2009, the company entered mobile game development. Classic SNK franchises include Art of Fighting, Fatal Fury, Metal Slug, Samurai Shodown, The Last Blade, World Heroes, Twinkle Star Sprites, and The King of Fighters.

History

Beginnings (1973–1981)

SNK was founded in 1973 as Shin Nihon Kikaku and reorganized in 1978 as a stock company (kabushiki gaisha) under the name "Shin Nihon Kikaku Corporation". When Eikichi Kawasaki noticed rapid growth in the coin-operated video game market, he expanded Shin Nihon Kikaku to include the development and marketing of stand-alone coin-op games.

The company was nicknamed "Shin Nihon Kikaku" in katakana at first, but since 1981 it has been changed to "SNK" by taking the initials from the Roman alphabet (Shin Nihon Kikaku). The English copyright notation was also "SNK CORPORATION". It established itself in Sunnyvale, California, to deliver its own brand of coin-operated games to arcades in North America. SNK chose John Rowe to head its American operation.

The first two titles that SNK released were Ozma Wars (1979), a vertical space shooter, and Safari Rally (1980), a maze game. Game quality improved over time, most notably with Vanguard (1981), a side-scrolling space shooter. SNK licensed the game to Centuri for distribution in North America. Centuri started manufacturing and distributing the game by itself when profits exceeded projections. In part due to the success of Vanguard, SNK began to gain fame and reputation. An American branch opened on October 20, 1981, named SNK Electronics Corporation.

SNK Corporation (1986–2001; first incarnation)

In April 1986, Shin Nihon Kikaku Corporation officially became SNK Corporation. In November 1986, SNK Electronics Corporation, the US branch, became SNK Corporation of America and moved to Sunnyvale, California. In March 1988, SNK staff moved to a building in Suita, Osaka, Japan.

At this point, the Japanese operations of SNK Corporation had shifted their focus solely toward developing and licensing video games for arcade use and later for early consoles. Between 1979 and 1986, SNK produced 23 stand-alone arcade games. Highlights from this period include Mad Crasher (1984), Alpha Mission (1985), and Athena (1986), a game that gained a large following when it was ported to the Nintendo Entertainment System (NES) in 1987. SNK's most successful game from this time was Ikari Warriors, released in 1986. It was so popular that it was licensed and ported to the Atari 2600, Atari 7800, Commodore 64, Amiga, Amstrad CPC, Apple II, ZX Spectrum, and NES. After Ikari Warriors, SNK released two sequels: Victory Road and Ikari III: The Rescue.

At the time, Japan was affected by the video game crash of 1983. The console manufacturer Nintendo remained in business throughout and after the crash. SNK became a third-party licensee for Nintendo's Famicom (alternative name for the NES) system in 1985. It opened a second branch in the US, called SNK Home Entertainment, based in Torrance, California. The branch handled the North American distribution and marketing of the company's products for home consoles. John Rowe had already left the company to form Tradewest, which went on to market the Ikari Warriors series in North America. Paul Jacobs took over Rowe's position over both halves of SNK America. He is known for having helped launch the company's Neo Geo system outside of Asia.

In response to strong sales of the company's NES ports, SNK began to dabble in the development of original software designed specifically for the NES console. Two games came out of this effort: Baseball Stars (1989) and Crystalis (1990; known as God Slayer in Japan). In 1989, two home video game consoles were released in North America: the Sega Genesis, and NEC and Hudson Soft's TurboGrafx-16. Nintendo followed suit with a new system in 1991, the Super Nintendo Entertainment System (Super NES, SNES). SNK as a whole did not become involved in the "system wars" of the early 1990s. Instead, it refocused its efforts on arcades. Other third parties, such as Romstar and Takara, were left to license and port SNK's properties to the various home consoles of the time with help from SNK's American home entertainment division. With console ports mainly handled outside the company, it moved on to developing SNK-branded arcade equipment. SNK also licensed Tiger Electronics to market handheld electronic games from some of its brands.

In 1988, SNK created the idea of a modular cabinet for arcades. Up to that point, arcade cabinets typically contained only one game. When an arcade operator wanted to switch or replace that game, it would have to completely remove the internals of the existing cabinet or exchange the entire setup for another game. SNK's new system, called the Neo Geo MVS (short for Multi Video System), featured multiple games in a single cabinet and used a cartridge-based storage mechanism. The system debuted in 1990 and could contain one, two, four, or six separate games in a single cabinet. To swap in a new game, all the operator had to do was remove one cartridge and exchange it for another. The MVS was an immediate success. It greatly shortened the setup time needed for each game, minimized floor space for cabinets, and reduced costs for new cartridges to US$500—less than half of what a traditional arcade unit cost at the time.

SNK wanted to bring arcade games to people's homes without making CPU and memory performance compromises that typical home consoles were forced to make. In 1990, the Neo Geo family was created. The company released a home version of the MVS, a single cartridge unit called the Neo Geo Advanced Entertainment System (Neo Geo AES). Initially, the AES was only available for rent or for use in hotel settings, but SNK quickly began selling the system through stores when customer response indicated that people were willing to spend money on home versions. Several franchises of games derived from it, including Sengoku, The King of Fighters, The Last Blade, Super Sidekicks, Art of Fighting, Metal Slug, Burning Fight, Savage Reign, Samurai Shodown, and Fatal Fury. The King of Fighters, Samurai Shodown, and Metal Slug series were continued on later consoles. SNK also helped publish third-party Neo Geo games such as ADK's World Heroes and Aggressors of Dark Kombat, Visco's Breakers and Ganryu, Noise Factory's Rage of the Dragons and Sengoku 3, Sunsoft's Galaxy Fight: Universal Warriors and Waku Waku 7, Sammy's Viewpoint, NMK's Zed Blade, Psikyo's Strikers 1945 Plus, Aiky/Taito's Pochi and Nyaa, Paon/Eleven/Gavaking's Nightmare in the Dark, Face's Money Puzzle Exchanger, Data East's Spinmaster and Street Slam, and Technōs Japan's Double Dragon and Voltage Fighter Gowcaizer. During this time, SNK also released stand-alone arcade games, some of which were ported to home consoles, including Vanguard, Alpha Mission, Athena, Ikari Warriors, Psycho Soldier, Touch Down Fever, Time Soldiers, P.O.W.: Prisoners of War, Beast Busters, and Street Smart.

Compared to other consoles at the time, the Neo Geo AES had much better graphics and sound; It debuted at $599, sold with two joystick controllers and a game (either Baseball Stars Professional or NAM-1975). Within a few months of the system's introduction in North America, SNK increased the cost to $649 and changed the pack-in game to Magician Lord. Alternatively, the console could be bought for $399 with one control stick and without an accompanying game. Other games cost at least $200 each. Joystick controllers contained the same four-button layout as the arcade MVS cabinet. The quality of AES games varied. Some, such as the Super Sidekicks series, were all-new creations, while others were updated versions of earlier successes, such as Baseball Stars Professional. SNK games were graphically bold and bright. Games such as Top Hunter: Roddy & Cathy and the famous Metal Slug series were distinctive and instantly recognizable, contributing to the system's success in arcades.

SNK also produced the Neo Geo CD home console, the Hyper Neo-Geo 64 arcade system, and two handheld game consoles, the Neo Geo Pocket and Pocket Color. Several more famous franchise titles, originally created for the MVS and AES systems, have been ported to other consoles such as the Genesis, Saturn and Dreamcast; SNES; PlayStation and PlayStation 2; Xbox; and Wii.

The Neo Geo Pocket was SNK's original handheld system. It was released in Japan in late 1998 and featured a monochrome (one-color) display. Because its sales were fewer than the expected number, it was discontinued in 1999 in favor of the Neo Geo Pocket Color, which was later released in North America and Europe. In 2001, the Neo Geo family ended. It was briefly revived 11 years later with the Neo Geo X.

In 1999, SNK opened the Neo Geo World Tokyo Bayside amusement park as part of the Palette Town entertainment complex in Odaiba, Tokyo equipped with attractions such as Ferris wheels and roller coasters. A large-scale tie-in was established with the Fujisankei Communications Group, owners of the nearby television station Fuji TV, and was frequently promoted in various media.

However, by the late 1990s, the 2D fighting game boom, which had been behind much of SNK's recent success, had come to an end, and both the Neo Geo CD and Hyper Neo Geo 64 failed to meet sales expectations. At the same time, the Neo Geo Pocket, while initially selling well, began to fall behind in the market after the release of the Game Boy Color, and Neo Geo World Tokyo Bayside quickly lost attendance after the re-opening of Yokohama Cosmo World a few months later, with the park considered to be a massive failure. In addition, the arcade game magazine Gamest, one of the biggest promoters of SNK titles, ceased publication after its publisher Shinseisha declared bankruptcy in 1999.

Bankruptcy and Playmore Corporation (2001–2003)
SNK had focused on the booming arcade industry for the 1990s, but as interest in arcades fell in favor of home and portable consoles going into the 2000s, they were unable to adjust to the changing market, with their recent hardware releases selling poorly and attempts to diversify into new markets such as amusement parks failing. SNK tried to develop more titles for the home console market, such as Shinsetsu Samurai Spirits Bushidō Retsuden, Athena: Awakening from the Ordinary Life, Koudelka, and Cool Cool Toon, but as none of them sold well it left the company's financial situation in a dire state.

In January 2000, SNK's poor financial status led to its acquisition by Aruze, a company known for its pachinko machines and the parent company of its competitor SETA. Instead of developing video games using SNK's intellectual properties, Aruze manufactured pachinko machines that featured popular series such as King of Fighters. SNK saw little success in the video game market.

The same year, Capcom agreed to create a series of fighting games featuring both companies' fighting game characters. The Capcom vs. SNK games were a success, however most of the profits went to Capcom because it developed and published the games. SNK released SNK vs. Capcom: Match of the Millennium and SNK vs. Capcom: Card Fighters Clash on the Neo Geo Pocket Color. Combined, the two games sold around 50,000 copies.

SNK closed all American operations on June 13, 2000. The company sold rights to distribution in North America for MVS arcade systems and Neo Print photo systems. It licensed North American localizations of some console releases to outside companies.

With low morale and an unclear future, many of the company's employees left their jobs. Some joined rivals Capcom and Arc System Works, and others moved on to found the developer Dimps. Kawasaki, along with five other former SNK executives, funded the formation of BrezzaSoft, which continued to develop Neo Geo games such as The King of Fighters 2001. Eyeing the end of the company, founder Eikichi Kawasaki left SNK along with other executives to found a company named Playmore on August 1, 2001.

On April 2, 2001, SNK applied to the Osaka District Court for application of the Civil Rehabilitation Law. The application was accepted, and revitalization proccedings were once underway, and the head office returned to Suity City, Osaka Prefecture.

On October 30, 2001, the Osaka District Court declared to SNK bankruptcy and went bankrupt, SNK filed for bankruptcy and placed the intellectual property rights for its franchises up for auction. Licenses for SNK's game production and development rights to its franchises were sold to several other companies. These included BrezzaSoft, which produced The King of Fighters franchise between 2001 and 2002, and Mega Enterprise, which produced Metal Slug 4.

To regain control of SNK, Kawasaki's new company, Playmore, successfully bid for and was awarded SNK's intellectual property rights on October 30, 2001. The company then began to bolster its assets and re-hire former SNK employees.

To re-establish its presence in the gaming market, Playmore acquired BrezzaSoft and its former SNK developers, as well as Japan-based Neo Geo developer Noise Factory. Sun Amusement, a Japanese commercial games distributor, was acquired by SNK to provide the company with an arcade distribution outlet in Japan. International offices were established in South Korea, Hong Kong, and the United States under the name SNK NeoGeo for commercial and, later, consumer gaming distribution. All of the acquired entities were consolidated into SNK Playmore on July 7, 2003 when Playmore regained rights to use the name SNK from Aruze. In the same year, SNK purchased ADK shortly after it filed for bankruptcy. Previously, ADK was a third-party company that had been heavily associated with SNK since the late 1980s. SNK Playmore's operations in Japan already largely resembled the original company: SNK employed many employees who left after its bankruptcy filing and occupied its former building.

In October 2002, Kawasaki sued Aruze for copyright infringement, claiming 6.2 billion Japanese yen (US$) in damages. He cited that Aruze had continued to use SNK's intellectual properties after Playmore re-acquired them. A preliminary decision in January 2004 by the Osaka District Court favored SNK Playmore, awarding it 5.64 billion yen (US$).

SNK Playmore (2003–2016)

In the fall and winter of 2003, SNK Playmore obtained an injunction against a group of four different companies, causing hundreds of AES cartridges to be seized. In the following year, SNK Playmore struck a compromise with two of the companies. The two were allowed to sell AES cartridges, under the conditions that the cartridges would not be modified again and that any legitimate materials would be returned to SNK Playmore.

Within the same year, SNK Playmore would discontinue the AES system, preferring to publish video games in cooperation with Sammy. Using its arcade board Atomiswave, SNK Playmore gained a more secure and modern platform for new arcade releases. In 2004, SNK Playmore officially became licensed to manufacture pachislot machines (Japanese slot machines played in pachinko parlors). The company released its first two machines that year: Metal Slug and Dragon Gal. Pachislots would be more heavily featured in SNK Playmore's product lineup for the next decade.

In September 2006 at the Tokyo Game Show (TGS), SNK Playmore announced that it had ceased producing games on the Atomiswave, favoring Taito's Type X2 arcade platform. To counter the decline in the commercial gaming industry, the company shifted some of its development focus to consumer games, including original games for the PlayStation 2, Nintendo DS, mobile phones, and other platforms. Games continue to be ported to the PlayStation 2, mostly in Europe because Sony Computer Entertainment of America (SCEA) did not approve most SNK Playmore games, and more rarely to the Xbox. In Japan, SNK Playmore released the NeoGeo Online Collection for the PlayStation 2, which contained some of its older games. It featured emulations, and online play was available through the KDDI matching service. The company also released original titles based on existing franchises such as Metal Slug and the KOF: Maximum Impact series.

In 2007, SNK Playmore USA released its first game on the Xbox Live Arcade, titled Fatal Fury Special. SNK Playmore also began supporting Nintendo's Virtual Console service on the Wii in the US with Fatal Fury, Art of Fighting, and World Heroes. In 2007, The King of Fighters XI and Neo Geo Battle Coliseum were released. SNK Playmore also released its first adult-themed game franchise, Doki Doki Majo Shinpan!, the first for any handheld console. In 2009, the company released The King of Fighters XII, which was not well-received by the public and critics alike due to polemic changes in the game's graphics and structure. In 2010, SNK Playmore released a sequel, The King of Fighters XIII, which was considered a much better game than its immediate predecessor. It either won or was nominated to multiple Game of the Year awards.

SNK has developed a great number of mobile games since 2009. It has licensed its characters for Chinese and other Asian games, mostly mobile.

In December 2012, SNK Playmore released the Neo Geo X, a relaunched mobile Neo Geo console. On October 2, 2013, SNK Playmore terminated its licensing agreement with the console's manufacturer, Tommo, effectively ending production of the Neo Geo X less than a year after its release. Tommo disputed the termination, stating that its contract was extended until 2016 and that it performed every obligation of the licensing agreement.

In June 2013, the VIGAMUS, a museum of video games in Rome, hosted an event dedicated to the history of SNK, tracing back the origins of the company and explaining the evolution of its games. Yamamoto Kei, Kiyoji Tomita, and Ogura Eisuke participated at the event and were interviewed. Ogura also drew two original illustrations to exhibit at the museum.

Foreign acquisition and brand restoration (2016–present)
In March 2015, Leyou Technologies Holdings submitted a disclosure of interest document to the Hong Kong Stock Exchange, highlighting a "possible investment in a renowned Japanese video game developer". Later in August, it was announced that Chinese web and mobile game giant 37Games, and asset management firm Orient Securities had formed a joint venture to invest in Ledo Millennium, a subsidiary of Leyou. Through Ledo, the venture acquired Kawasaki's 81.25% stake in SNK Playmore for $63.5 million. The reason given for the acquisition was to gain rights to SNK Playmore's intellectual property, and further develop them by following Marvel Entertainment's approach to mass media. The joint venture planned to integrate games, comics, film, and television in a media franchise.

With the purchase completed, SNK Playmore signaled a shift in the company's strategy, which had previously been focused more on the production of pachislot and mobile games than its traditional area, console and arcade games. In 2015, SNK Playmore announced that it was withdrawing from the pachislot market, choosing instead to focus on console and mobile gaming, as well as character licensing using its popular characters such as Mai Shiranui, Ukyou Tachibana, Nakoruru, and Haohmaru. Additionally, all of the aforementioned characters made their appearance as guest characters in a mobile multiplayer online battle arena (MOBA), Wangzhe Rongyao, roughly translated to English as Honor of Kings, which is the world highest-grossing game of all time as well as the most downloaded mobile app globally.

On April 25, 2016, SNK officially dropped the "Playmore" name from its corporate logo and reintroduced its old slogan, "The Future Is Now", to signify "a return to SNK's rich gaming history". A legal name change from SNK Playmore Corporation to SNK Corporation followed on December 1, 2016, to more firmly establish SNK Playmore as the successor to the old SNK brand and legacy. The King of Fighters XIV, the first entry in its series in more than half a decade, was released in 2016. In July 2018, SNK released the NEOGEO Mini, a miniature console based on the design of the company's Japanese arcade machines. It was pre-loaded with forty classic Neo Geo games.

In June 2019, the 12th entry in the Samurai Shodown series was released for the PlayStation 4 and Xbox One, followed by an arcade version in October and a Nintendo Switch version later in the year.

On September 4, 2019, Nintendo announced that Fatal Fury protagonist and The King of Fighters character Terry Bogard would be added as a downloadable, playable character to Super Smash Bros. Ultimate, with a planned release in November 2019. Terry was made available on November 6, alongside a The King of Fighters-based stage and 50 songs from various SNK series.

In November 2020, the MiSK Foundation, a non-profit organization owned by the crown prince of Saudi Arabia, Mohammed Bin Salman, acquired a 33.3% share of SNK through its subsidiary, Electronic Game Development Company (EGDC), with the intention to acquire a further 17.7% share at a later time as to gain controlling interest in the company. In February 2022, EGDC's ownership share was increased to 96.18%. SNK will relocate its main headquarter to Yodogawa-ku, Osaka on March 20th, 2023.

Subsidiaries and related corporations

Current
 SNK Entertainment – founded in February 2016 to contract and develop new digital entertainment including video games. It ramps up activity that surrounds SNK's library of intellectual properties with "new and exciting sublicensing opportunities and collaborations".
 SNK Beijing
 SNK H.K., Ltd. – handles character licensing, as well as hardware and software sales in East Asia (except for Japan)
 SNK USA Corporation – publisher of software and animation in America. Formerly known as "SNK Corporation of America", which originally handled publishing software sales in America from 1981 to 2001.
 Playmore Creative House Co.,Ltd – It is a video game formatting company for SNK and other game companies.

Former
 ADK – former game developer for the Neo Geo. SNK purchased its intellectual property assets when the company became bankrupt in 2003. Developed Aggressors of Dark Kombat, the Crossed Swords series, Gang Wars, Ninja Combat, Ninja Commando, Ninja Master's: Haō Ninpō Chō, Over Top, Shōgi no Tatsujin: Master of Syougi, Sky Soldiers, Sky Adventure, Super Champion Baseball, Time Soldiers, Twinkle Star Sprites, and the World Heroes series.
 BrezzaSoft – co-developer of The King of Fighters 2001 with Eolith.
 Eolith – co-developer of The King of Fighters 2001 with BrezzaSoft, co-developer of The King of Fighters 2002 with Playmore.
 Face Co. Ltd. – developer of Gururin, Money Puzzle Exchanger, and ZuPaPa!.
 Mega Enterprise – co-developer of Metal Slug 4 and Metal Slug 5 with Noise Factory.
 Nazca Corporation – former game developer for the Neo Geo (Metal Slug and Neo Turf Masters), later acquired by SNK
 Neo Geo do Brasil – handled hardware and software sales in Brazil from 1993 to 1998
 Noise Factory – co-developer of Metal Slug 4 and Metal Slug 5 with Mega Enterprise, formerly owned by SNK
 Pallas – developed Eight Man and Super Baseball 2020.
 Sacnoth – developed Dive Alert, Koudelka, and Faselei!.
 Saurus – developed Ironclad, Pleasure Goal: 5 on 5 Mini Soccer, the Shock Troopers series, the Stakes Winner series, and The Irritating Maze. Co-developed Prehistoric Isle 2 with Yumekobo, co-developed Quiz King of Fighters with SNK, and co-developed Ragnagard with System Vision.
 SNK Playmore Europe Corporation – handled software sales in Europe
 Sun Amusement – published Metal Slug 4 and The King of Fighters 2001.
 Viccom – developed Fight Fever.
 Yumekobo – developed Blazing Star, co-developed Prehistoric Isle 2 with Saurus.

See also
List of SNK games
SETA Corporation, former sister company

References

External links

 (current)
 (archives)

 
Japanese companies established in 1978
Amusement companies of Japan
Companies based in Osaka Prefecture
Companies that have filed for bankruptcy in Japan
Japanese brands
Japanese companies established in 2001
Re-established companies
Video game companies established in 1978
Video game companies established in 2001
Video game companies of Japan
Video game development companies
Video game publishers